Chikuma District was a district located in Shinano Province.

The district was centered at the current city of Matsumoto, then capital of Shinano, but on January 14, 1879, the district split off into Higashi-chikuma and Nishi-chikuma Districts (Nishichikuma District was later renamed Kiso District). Until the Meiji Era, the district was known as "Tsukama" but the pronunciation was changed to "Chikuma". However, people in Matsumoto still pronounce it "Tsukama", as in Tsukama Elementary School (筑摩小学校-つかましょうがっこう).

Chikuma District once encompassed the present municipalities of Matsumoto (excluding parts of Nagawa, Azusagawa and Azumi areas), Shiojiri, the areas of Tazawa, Hikari, and Kawate from Azumino, Higashichikuma District, Kiso District, and the areas of Yamaguchi, Magome, and Kamisaka areas in the city of Nakatsugawa in Gifu Prefecture.

The district acquired the Kiso Region from Ena District in Mino Province during the Kamakura Period. But the district still has the Maseki area once located in Sarashina District. The district seat is unknown but the city of Matsumoto is a possibility.

Districts in Nagano Prefecture